The 2020 United States presidential election in Missouri was held on Tuesday, November 3, 2020, as part of the 2020 United States presidential election in which all 50 states plus the District of Columbia participated. Missouri voters chose electors to represent them in the Electoral College via a popular vote, pitting the Republican Party's nominee, incumbent President Donald Trump of Florida, and running mate Vice President Mike Pence of Indiana against Democratic Party nominee, former Vice President Joe Biden of Delaware, and his running mate Senator Kamala Harris of California. Missouri has 10 electoral votes in the Electoral College.

Trump won Missouri again by a 15.4% margin. This was 3.1% lower than his 2016 margin, but still a better performance in the state than that of any other Republican nominee since Ronald Reagan in 1984. Prior to the election, most news organizations considered this a state Trump would win; during the 21st century Missouri has shifted away from being one of the most notable bellwether states towards becoming a solidly red state. This is the first time since 1916 (and only the second time ever) that Missouri has voted more Republican than neighboring Kansas.

Biden became the second ever Democrat after Barack Obama to secure the White House without carrying Missouri.

Primary elections

Democratic primary

Republican primary

Libertarian primary

Green primary

General election

Predictions

Voter demographics

Polling
Graphical summary

Aggregate polls

Polls

Donald Trump vs. Michael Bloomberg

Donald Trump vs. Pete Buttigieg

Donald Trump vs. Kamala Harris

Donald Trump vs. Beto O'Rourke

Donald Trump vs. Bernie Sanders

Donald Trump vs. Elizabeth Warren

Results

By county

By congressional district
Trump won 6 of 8 congressional districts.

Analysis
A bellwether state for the bulk of the 20th century, Missouri has since come to vote reliably Republican in presidential elections. This has been attributed to a shift in Republican policy towards right-wing populism and social conservatism; the platform has found fertile ground in the state, which lies in the Bible Belt, with Trump carrying 86% of White, born-again/Evangelical Christians.

Biden won the same four jurisdictions that Barack Obama and Hillary Clinton did in 2012 and 2016, respectively: Jackson County, home to Kansas City; Boone County, home to the college town of Columbia; and St. Louis County, home to the suburbs of St. Louis, which he also won. Biden also improved Democratic margins in Platte and Clay counties, both suburbs of Kansas City; Platte was carried by Trump by only 3%, and Clay by 4%. In addition, the 61% of the vote that Biden won in St. Louis County was the best performance for a Democrat since Lyndon B. Johnson's 1964 landslide.

Per exit polls by the Associated Press, Trump's strength in Missouri came from voters who trusted him on economic policy: a 57% majority believed Trump was better able to handle international trade. With a hybrid industrial-service-agricultural economy, 63% of Missourian voters favored increasing taxes on goods imported to the U.S. from other countries, and these voters broke for Trump by 67%. As is the case in many Southern and border states, there was a stark racial divide in voting for this election: White Missourians supported Trump by 62%, while black Missourians supported Biden by 88%. Trump became the first Republican to win Missouri by double digits twice.

In other elections, incumbent Republican Mike Parson easily defeated State Auditor Nicole Galloway by 16 points—outperforming Trump—in the governor's race, further testifying to the state's trend towards the GOP, and becoming the best performance for a Republican on the gubernatorial level since John Ashcroft's 1988 victory.

See also
 United States presidential elections in Missouri
 2020 United States presidential election
 2020 Democratic Party presidential primaries
 2020 Libertarian Party presidential primaries
 2020 Green Party presidential primaries
 2020 Republican Party presidential primaries
 2020 United States elections

Notes

Partisan clients

References

Further reading

External links
 
 
  (State affiliate of the U.S. League of Women Voters)
 

Missouri
2020
Presidential